Gruffudd Fychan (antiquarian spelling: Gruffydd Fychan) could refer to:

Gruffydd Fychan ap Iorwerth (c. 1150–1221), Welsh knight and marcher lord
Gruffudd Fychan I, Prince of Powys Fadog (reigned 1277–1284)
Gruffudd Fychan II (c. 1330–1369), Lord of Glyndyfrdwy and Cynllaith and father of Owain Glyndŵr, Prince of Wales
Gruffudd Fychan ap Gruffudd ab Ednyfed (14th century), a Welsh-language poet
Gruffudd Vychan (c. 1395–1447), Welsh knight and supporter of Owain Glyndŵr